Mary Wynn (March 13, 1902 – December 22, 2001) was an American film actress of the silent film era.

Biography
Born Phoebe Isabelle Bassor Watson in San Francisco, California, she began acting with a 1914 role in False Pride, starring Jennie Lee and Charles Gorman. Her biggest film, in which she had a minor role, was in the 1915 classic film The Birth of a Nation, starring Lillian Gish, Mae Marsh, and directed by D. W. Griffith. In 1920 she would star opposite James Harrison in Hot Stuff.

From 1920 to 1923 she appeared in nineteen films. Some sources have her possibly credited with a role in the 1929 film Crashing Through, but as to whether she was or was not in that film has never been confirmed beyond doubt. Not including that film, she is officially credited with having appeared in twenty one films during her short career. She was residing in Calabasas, California at the time of her death on December 22, 2001. At the time of her death at 99, she was the last living cast member of The Birth of a Nation.

Filmography

References

External links

American silent film actresses
Actresses from San Francisco
1902 births
2001 deaths
People from Calabasas, California
20th-century American actresses
American film actresses